Perfect Imperfection is a 2016 Chinese romantic drama film directed by Chen Bing and starring Ady An and Ahn Jae-hyun. It was released in China on November 25, 2016. It won the Golden Angel Award for Film at the 12th Chinese American Film Festival.

Plot

Cast
Ady An as Ye Xiaomeng
Ahn Jae-hyun as Leng An
Alex Fong as David
Song Jiayang
Wang Shuaishuai as Yaoyao
Zhang Xun
Wong Yut Fei as Dai Ding
Kingdom Yuen
Ye Yiqian

Reception
The film has grossed  at the Chinese box office.

References

Chinese romantic drama films
2016 romantic drama films
Huaxia Film Distribution films
2010s Mandarin-language films